Zama Lake is a large lake in Mackenzie County, in north-western Alberta, Canada.

Major Ernest Wilson Hubbell, Chief Inspector of the Dominion Land Survey, recorded the name "Zammah River" in his field notes as the transliteration of the name of a Slavey Chief (Slavey Indians are now known as the Dene Tha' First Nation). The Geographic Board of Canada recorded the name "Zama River" on 4 July 1922 without explanation for the spelling change. The lake seems to be named in the same fashion and was named on 6 November 1944. The Dene Tha' do not use the name "Zama Lake", but use names in the Slavey language to identify the lake; some use K’ah Woti Túé (“Main Blind Lake” referring to a hunting blind) and others use Tulonh Mieh (“Where the Water Ends”).

The Hay-Zama Lakes complex is a Ramsar site for its importance to spring and fall migrating ducks and geese. As many as 250,000 ducks and geese use the lakes during the fall migration.

References

Lakes of Alberta
Mackenzie County